DXBN is the callsign of the following radio stations located in Butuan:

 DXBN-AM, an AM station of Philippine Broadcasting Service
 DXBN-TV, a TV station of People's Television Network